Göran Lars Titus (born 7 June 1967 in Luleå, Norrbotten) is a former Swedish freestyle swimmer. He competed in the 1988 Summer Olympics and in the 1992 Summer Olympics. His best individual result is a 9th place in the 50 m freestyle 1992.

Clubs
Örebro SA
Karlskrona SS

References
 

1967 births
Living people
Swimmers at the 1988 Summer Olympics
Swimmers at the 1992 Summer Olympics
Olympic swimmers of Sweden
European Aquatics Championships medalists in swimming
ÖSA swimmers
Karlskrona SS swimmers
People from Luleå
Swedish male freestyle swimmers
Sportspeople from Norrbotten County